Andrew Bodel (born 12 February 1957) is a former professional footballer who played for Oxford United and Oxford City.

References

External links

Rage Online Profile

1957 births
Living people
Northampton Town F.C. players
Oxford United F.C. players
Sportspeople from Clydebank
Footballers from West Dunbartonshire
English footballers
Association football defenders
Anglo-Scots